Agyneta arietans is a species of sheet weaver found in Germany and Poland. It was described by O.P.-Cambridge in 1872.

References

arietans
Spiders described in 1872
Spiders of Europe
Fauna of Germany
Fauna of Poland